Krista Nell (1946–1975) was an Austrian film actress.

Born Doris Kristanel, Krista Nell debuted in French cinema, then moved to Rome where became a minor starlet in Italian genre films, especially Spaghetti Westerns and commedie sexy all'italiana. Nell went on to star in such films as Ivanhoe, the Norman Swordsman, and Spaghetti Westerns such as Paid in Blood, Blindman, Kill Django... Kill First and Django and Sartana Are Coming... It's the End.

Nell's final film was The Bloodsucker Leads the Dance in which she was supposed to be the main actress, but, because of her physical conditions, she turned in a secondary role. Nell died of leukemia at age 28 on 19 June 1975. She was the companion of actor Ettore Manni.

Partial filmography

 Pierrot le Fou (1965) - Madame Staquet (uncredited)
 Your Money or Your Life (1966) - Geneviève
 The Beckett Affair (1966) - Paulette
 Massacre of Pleasure (1967) - Marion
 Kitosch, the Man Who Came from the North (1967) - Eva
 The Million Eyes of Sumuru (1967) - the Slave of Sumuru / Zoe
 Uno di più all'inferno (1968)
 The Longest Hunt (1968) - Tina
 Un corpo caldo per l'inferno (1969) - Greta Nielsen
 Tarzan in the Golden Grotto (1969) - Mary
 The Guerilla, or He Who Did Not Believe (1969) - Juanita - la femme d'un guerillero
 Eros e Thanatos (1969)
 Ombre roventi (1970)
 La banda de los tres crisantemos (1970) - Marilyn
 Les belles au bois dormantes (1970) - Christine
 Django and Sartana Are Coming... It's the End (1970) - Cleo
 Kill Django... Kill First (1971) - Julia -Amante di Burton
 Ivanhoe, the Norman Swordsman (1971) - Brenda
 The Feast of Satan (1971) - Hilda Salas
 Paid in Blood (1971) - Cora
 Blindman (1971) - Bride
 Karzan, il favoloso uomo della jungla (1972) - Fox's Wife (uncredited)
 Decameron n° 2 - Le altre novelle del Boccaccio (1972) - Egano's wife
 Sei iellato, amico hai incontrato Sacramento (1972) - Evelyn
 Le calde notti del Decameron (1972) - Suor Martuccia
 Decameron proibitissimo (Boccaccio mio statte zitto) (1972) - Donna Piccarda
 The Sensuous Doll (1972) - The Subservient Doll
 So Sweet, So Dead (1972) - Renata
 La prima notte di quiete (1972) - Martine - the girl reading Daniele's palm (uncredited)
 Fratello homo sorella bona (1972) - Laura
 God Is My Colt .45 (1972) - Mary Bryan
 The Godfather's Friend (1972) - Layla
 Decameroticus (1972) - Isabella
 Mamma... li turchi! (1973) - Baroness
 Le amorose notti di Ali Baba (1973) - Yashira
 Prostituzione (1974) - Immacolata Mussomecci
 Delitto d'autore (1974) - Sonia
 The Bloodsucker Leads the Dance (1975) - Cora (final film role)

References

External links 
 

Austrian film actresses
1946 births
1975 deaths
Spaghetti Western actresses
Deaths from leukemia
20th-century Austrian actresses